The following list of accelerator mass spectrometry facilities includes research centers that employ accelerator mass spectrometry (AMS).

Accelerator mass spectrometry is a form of mass spectrometry that accelerates ions to extraordinarily high kinetic energies before mass analysis.

Facilities

Africa
 iThemba Laboratory for Accelerator Based Sciences (www.tlabs.ac.za), Johannesburg, South Africa

Oceania
 14UD The Australian National University, Canberra, Australia
 SSAMS The Australian National University, Canberra, Australia
 ANTARES 10MV, STAR 2MV , Sydney, Australia
 Rafter Radiocarbon Laboratory, GNS Science, New Zealand
 Chronos 14Carbon-Cycle Facility, UNSW, Australia.

North America
 Accium BioSciences at Swedish Medical Center Cherry Hill, Seattle, WA
 André E. Lalonde Accelerator Mass Spectrometry Laboratory (AEL AMS) at the University of Ottawa in Ottawa, Canada http://www.ams.uottawa.ca/
 Beta Analytic Accelerator Mass Spectrometry Facility in Miami, Florida
 Center for Accelerator Mass Spectrometry (CAMS) at the Lawrence Livermore National Laboratory
 Center for Applied Isotope Studies (CAIS) at University of Georgia.
 DirectAMS  (D-AMS) radiocarbon labs in Bothell, WA & Seattle, WA
 Institute for Structure and Nuclear Astrophysics, The University of Notre Dame, Notre Dame, Indiana
 Institutes of Energy and the Environment Radiocarbon Laboratory at the Pennsylvania State University, University Park, Pennsylvania
 MegaSIMS at the University of California, Los Angeles in Los Angeles, CA
 National Ocean Sciences Accelerator Mass Spectrometry (NOSAMS) Facility at Woods Hole Oceanographic Institution
 NSF - Arizona Accelerator Mass Spectrometry (AMS) Laboratory
 Pharmaron ABS, Inc. in Germantown, Maryland
 Purdue Rare Isotope Measurement Laboratory at Purdue University in West Lafayette, Indiana
 Trace Element Accelerator Mass Spectrometer (TEAMS) at the Naval Research Laboratory in Washington, DC
 W.M. Keck Carbon Cycle Accelerator Mass Spectrometry (KCCAMS) Facility at the University of California, Irvine

Asia
 Inter University Accelerator Centre (IUAC), New Delhi 110067 . http://www.iuac.res.in/
 Xi'an AMS Center
 Tandem accelerator for Environmental Research and Radiocarbon Analysis (NIES-TERRA) of the National Institute for Environmental Studies (NIES), Tsukuba, Japan
 BINP AMS Facility, Novosibirsk, Russia
 National Taiwan University, Department of Geosciences, Taipei, Taiwan, R.O.C
 Accelerator Unit for Radioisotope Studies (AURiS), Geoscience Division, Physical Research Laboratory, Ahmedabad, India. https://www.prl.res.in/prl-eng/division/pgdn

Europe
 Vilnius Radiocarbon AMS dating laboratory in Vilnius, Lithuania
 Centre for Isotopic Research on Cultural and Environmental heritage (CIRCE), Mathematics and Physics Department, Università degli Studi della Campania "Luigi Vanvitelli", Caserta, Italy
 CEREGE in Aix en Provence, France
 LMC14 Laboratoire de mesure du carbone 14, at LSCE, Saclay, France
 LSCE-ECHoMICADAS , at LSCE, Gif-sur-Yvette, France 
 14Chrono Centre for Climate, the Environment, and Chronology Queen's University Belfast, Northern Ireland
 Bristol Radiocarbon Accelerator Mass Spectrometer at University of Bristol, England
 RICH, Royal Institute for Cultural heritage, Brussels, Belgium
 CologneAMS at University of Cologne, Germany
 Hertelendi Laboratory of Environmental Studies at ATOMKI, Debrecen, Hungary
 DREAMS at Dresden, Germany
 Centre for Isotope Research Rijksuniversiteit Groningen, The Netherlands
 Beta Analytic Europe in London, England
 Tandem Laboratory at Uppsala University in Uppsala, Sweden
 Lund Accelerator Mass Spectrometry Facility at Lund University, Sweden
  RoAMS Laboratory of the "Horia Hulubei" National Institute for Physics and Nuclear Engineering Măgurele, Romania
 AMS at the Maier-Leibnitz-Laboratory joint facility of Ludwig Maximilian University of Munich and Technical University of Munich, Germany
 Oxford Radiocarbon Accelerator Unit, University of Oxford, United Kingdom
 POZNAN RADIOCARBON LABORATORY, Poland
 Centre for Dating and Diagnostics (CEDAD), University of Salento, Italy 
  Centro Nacional de Aceleradores, CNA University of Sevilla, Spain
 NERC Recognised Accelerator Mass Spectrometer at SUERC, Scotland
 Vienna Environmental Research Accelerator at the University of Vienna, Austria
 Ion Beam Physics Laboratory of the ETH Zurich and the Paul Scherrer Institute, Switzerland
National 1MV AMS Laboratory, TÜBİTAK Marmara Research Center Turkey
  Nuclear Physics Institute, The Czech Academy of Sciences, Czech Republic
https://ydbe.mam.tubitak.gov.tr/tr/ams-hizlandirilmis-kutle-spektroskopisi-laboratuvari

Closed Facilities 

 Eckert & Ziegler Vitalea Science AMS company based in Davis, California, closed in 2016.

External links
 C-14 Information and Labs (radiocarbon.org)
 Tandetron Accelerator Mass Spectrometers (highvolteng.com)
 AMS Laboratories. University of Arizona. Tucson, AZ.
 AMS Facilities of the World compiled by Walter Kutschera (to the best of his knowledge), VERA Lab, Faculty of Physics, University of Vienna, Austria.

 
Mass spectronomy